Robert Dumitru Răducanu (born 5 September 1996 in Bucharest) is a Romanian footballer who plays as a striker for SC Popești-Leordeni.

Honours
FC U Craiova 1948
Liga II: 2020–21
Liga III: 2019–20

References

External links

1996 births
Living people
Footballers from Bucharest
Romanian footballers
Association football forwards
Liga I players
Liga II players
Liga III players
CS Concordia Chiajna players
FC Viitorul Constanța players
FC U Craiova 1948 players
FC Universitatea Cluj players